Merriam's chipmunk (Neotamias merriami) is a species of rodent in the family Sciuridae. It is found in central and southern California in the United States and a small area in northern Baja California, Mexico. 

The dental formula for Tamias merriami is

Reproduction 
When mating, females attract males by calling to them. The duration of the female call is ten to fifteen minutes. A male will hear the call and respond to it by running to and jumping around the female. The female then squats down, and the male performs 12-24 thrusts. The entire process of mating lasts about fifteen seconds.

References

Neotamias
Mammals described in 1889
Taxonomy articles created by Polbot